Šeparović is a Croatian surname.

It is the third most common surname in the Dubrovnik-Neretva County of Croatia.

It may refer to:

Frances Separovic, Croatian-born Australian biophysical chemist
Ivo Šeparović, Croatian international footballer
Miroslav Šeparović, Croatian lawyer
Zvonimir Šeparović, Croatian legal scholar and politician

References

Croatian surnames